William Dowler Morris (August 22, 1857 – April 13, 1931) was mayor of Ottawa, Ontario, Canada in 1901.

He was born in County Leitrim, Ireland in 1857 and came to Canada in 1877. He became involved in the oil, coal and real estate businesses; he also owned a brickyard. Morris was first elected to city council in 1892. He was forced to resign as mayor after being convicted of drinking after hours at the Russell House, an Ottawa hotel, an offence under the liquor license act.  Under Ontario law at the time, the law provided that a violator of provincial law was disqualified from voting or holding public office for a period of two years, and Mayor Morris pled guilty on November 16, 1901.

During his term as mayor, he was instrumental in persuading philanthropist Andrew Carnegie to donate funds for the main branch of the Ottawa Public Library; the city made a commitment to allocate funds for the ongoing upkeep of the library. However, the mayor of the time, James A. Ellis, chose not to invite Morris to the 1906 opening. Morris also served as a transport officer in World War I at the age of 60.

Morris died in Bermuda in 1931.

References 

Chain of Office: Biographical Sketches of the Early Mayors of Ottawa (1847-1948), Dave Mullington

1857 births
1931 deaths
Mayors of Ottawa
Politicians from County Leitrim
People from County Leitrim
Irish emigrants to Canada (before 1923)